This is a list of all personnel changes for the 2020 EuroLeague off-season and 2020–21 EuroLeague season.

Retirements
The following players who played in the 2019–20 Euroleague, and played more than three EuroLeague seasons, retired.

Managerial changes

Managerial changes

Player movements

Between two EuroLeague teams

To a EuroLeague team

Leaving a EuroLeague team

References

Transactions
EuroLeague transactions